Mahbub Alam Pollab(), is a Bangladeshi born Korean actor and film director. He acted in several films in South Korea. He is also the director of Asia Media Culture Factory and Freeport

Acting career 
Mahbub Alam migrated from Bangladesh to South Korea in 1999 as a migrant worker. From 2002 He started making documentary on life of migrant workers. In 2005 Alam worked in a Korean short film called "Dream of Revenge".  In 2009 he made his debut as a lead actor in film named "Where is Ronny"  In that same year he acted in a Korean Indie film named "Bandhobi" opposite of Baek Jin-hee. He played a role of Bangladeshi migrant worker named Karim. It received several awards including Best Film Award in 31st Festival of three Continents.He has also worked on several TV shows and advertisements.

Filmography 

 Where is Ronny...
 Bandhobi (2009)
 City of Crane
 Love in Korea(Documentary)
 Black Gull
 Son of a man 
 Chinese Winter
 My friend and his wife
 Pained
 You Are My Vampire
 Cheo Yong
 Perfect Proposal
 Asura: The City of Madness

Awards and honours 
Mahbub Alam received several awards including the president award of South Korea in 2012.

Popularity In Bangladesh 
The Daily Prothom Alo first published an article about Alam's film "Bandhobi" in 2009. In 2014 he appeared in popular Bengali magazine show Ityadi.

See also 

 Bandhobi
Baek Jin-hee
 Shin Dong-il

References

External links
 
  
 
 
 

1978 births
Living people
Korean people of Bangladeshi descent
South Korean male film actors
South Korean male television actors
South Korean television personalities
21st-century South Korean male actors